Mangelia ahuiri  is a species of sea snail, a marine gastropod mollusc in the family Mangeliidae.

Description
The length of the shell attains 8 mm.

Distribution
This marine species occurs off the Western Sahara and Morocco.

References

 Cossignani T. & Ardovini R. (2011) Una nuova specie di Mangelia dal Marocco Atlantico. Malacologia Mostra Mondiale 71: 10. page(s): 10

External links

ahuiri
Gastropods described in 2011